Indicia may refer to:

Indicia (philately), markings on a mail piece showing that postage has been paid by the sender
Indicia (publishing), a piece of text traditionally appearing on the first recto page after the cover, which usually contains the official name of the publication
Information Based Indicia, a system used by the United States Postal Service